The Lilieae are a monophyletic tribe of monocotyledon perennial, herbaceous mainly bulbous flowering plants in the lily family (Liliaceae).

Taxonomy 

The term has varied over the years but in modern classification constitutes either a broad circumscription (Lilieae sensu lato, s.l.) with eight genera, placed in the subfamily Lilioideae, or narrower circumscription with six genera (Lilieae sensu stricto, s.s.), excluding Tulipa (which now includes Amana) and Erythronium which are treated as a separate tribe, Tulipeae. Within Lilieae s.s., Gagea now includes Lloydia, and Lilium includes Nomocharis, reducing the number of genera to four, with about 260–300 species.

Phylogeny 

The evolutionary and phylogenetic relationships between the genera currently included in Liliaceae are shown in this cladogram.

Distribution and habitat 

Lilieae s.s. are distributed in temperate Northern Hemisphere areas, with the main centre of diversity in the Qinghai–Tibet Plateau, where about 100 species may be found. Other areas include East  Asia,  Central  and  West  Asia,  the  Mediterranean  Basin  and  North  America.

See also 
 Taxonomy of Liliaceae
 Tulipeae

References

Bibliography

Books 

 
  In

Articles

Websites 

  (see also Angiosperm Phylogeny Website) 

Liliaceae
Monocot tribes